Hugh McMonagle (1817 – October 12, 1889) was an inn-keeper and political figure in New Brunswick, later a province of Canada. He represented King County in the Legislative Assembly of New Brunswick from 1856 to 1857.

He was born in Hillsborough, Albert County, the son of Cornelius McMonagle, a native of Ireland, and Anne Scott. McMonagle later settled in Sussex Corner. He was married twice: first to Margaret Roach and then to Mary Roach, her sister. McMonagle raised cows and work horses as well as raising and training pure-bred race horses. He introduced the Morgan horse to New Brunswick. McMonagle's horse Livingstone defeated George Gilbert's Retriever in the so-called "Great race of 1847".

References 

1817 births
1889 deaths
Members of the Legislative Assembly of New Brunswick
People from Albert County, New Brunswick
People from Kings County, New Brunswick
Colony of New Brunswick people
Canadian people of Irish descent